Platyceps josephi is a species of snake discovered in 2021 in Tamil Nadu, India. The species faces a number of threats including habitat destruction due to grasslands in southern Tamil Nadu being converted into plantations, farmlands, and urban areas.

References 

josephi
Reptiles described in 2021